Humiriastrum melanocarpum is a species of plant in the Humiriaceae family. It is endemic to Colombia.

References

Humiriaceae
Endangered plants
Endemic flora of Colombia
Taxonomy articles created by Polbot